Benobble is a rural locality in the Scenic Rim Region, Queensland, Australia.

Geography 
There are two landmarks in the locality, both referring to sharp bends in the Tamborine Mountain Road on the south-eastern boundary of the locality:

 Devils Elbow  
 Upper Hairpin Bend

History 

The name Benobble is derived from the Bundjalung language (Yugumbir dialect, Wongerriburra clan) words a meaning  "place of the tall bloodwood trees", where  means "bloodwood tree" and  means "long" or "tall." The name Benobble was initially used as a sawmill name and then as a railway station name from 28 January 1915.

Benobble railway station was on the Cangungra railway line, which operated from 1915 to 1955.

In the  Benobble had a population of 43 people. The locality contains 17 households, in which 51.4% of the population are males and 48.6% of the population are females with a median age of 34, 4 below above the national average. The average weekly household income is $1,416, $22 below the national average.

Education 
There are no schools in Benobble. The nearest government primary school is Canungra State School in neighbouring Canungra to the south. The nearest government secondary school is Tamborine Mountain State High School in neighbouring Tamborine Mountain to the north-east.

References 

Scenic Rim Region
Localities in Queensland